The Northwest Montana Wetland Management District is a wildlife management region in the U.S. state of Montana, a part of the National Bison Range Complex along with four other wildlife refuges and the National Bison Range.

History 
The individual lands were acquired beginning in 1970 by purchasing plots from willing landowners, and an ongoing effort to continue to increase area.

Background 
The district comprises numerous small wetland environments set aside primarily to protect areas for waterfowl. The district comprises 14 separate Waterfowl Production Areas (WPA)'s totalling  and one  conservation easement along the north shores of Flathead Lake. Some of the land is located on the Flathead Indian Reservation (known as the Tribal Trust Lands of the Confederated Salish and Kootenai Tribes) and they continue to have claim over the land provided they assist in maintaining the resource. The Northwest Montana Wetland Management District is administered by the United States Fish and Wildlife Service, an agency within the United States Department of the Interior.

Of the 200 species of birds reportedly observed on district lands, Canada goose, peregrine falcon, green-winged teal, meadowlark, owls, ring-necked pheasant, great blue heron and numerous species of ducks can be found here. Small mammals such as the porcupine, muskrat, mink, beaver and skunk are also common.

Kalispell, Montana is within  of many of the different locations.

References

External links
 Northwest Montana Wetland Management District

National Bison Range Complex
National Wildlife Refuges in Montana
Wetlands of Montana
Nature reserves in Montana
Protected areas of Flathead County, Montana
Protected areas of Lake County, Montana
Protected areas of Sanders County, Montana
Protected areas established in 1970
1970 establishments in Montana